CCSO may refer to:
 Cape Cod Symphony Orchestra, the Cape Symphony orchestra
 CCSO Nameserver, Computing and Communications Services Office Ph Nameserver, an early form of database search on the Internet
Citrus County Sheriff's Office